Black Scottish people are a racial or ethnic group of Scottish who identify as or are ethnically African or Black. Used in association with black Scottish identity, the term commonly refers to Scottish of Black African and African-Caribbean descent. The group (also referred to as African-Scottish, Afro-Scottish, or Black Scottish) represent approximately 0.7 percent of the total population of Scotland.

Background

Census
According to the 2011 UK Census, Black Scottish people (self-described as African, Caribbean, Black or any other Black background) were numbered at about 36,000. This figure indicates an increase in population of 28,000 Black Scottish since the previous UK census in 2001. The group represents around 0.7% of Scotland's population, compared to 3.0% of the overall UK population.

Identity

The identity of Black Scottish people has evolved since the arrival of Black people in Scotland as early as the fifteenth century, with significant numbers arriving in the twentieth century after World War II. The development of a cohesive Black Scottish identity has progressed, with Black African and Afro-Caribbean descent the most commonly claimed ancestry involved in the sense of identity. Among other factors, studies into the experiences of Scottish Somalis, who tend to be historically newer immigrant groups to the nation, have shown that ethnoreligious factors can complicate the expression of any monocultural or racial identity of Black Scottish.

Notable Black Scottish people

Arts and entertainment
Aminatta Forna (writer)
Kayus Bankole (member of Mercury Prize winners Young Fathers)
Shereen Cutkelvin (singer in girl group Neon Jungle)
Nicolette (musician)
Tony Osoba (actor)
Layla-Roxanne Hill (writer and activist)
Finley Quaye (musician)
Jackie Kay (writer)
Eunice Olumide (model)
Luke Sutherland (novelist and musician)
Ncuti Gatwa (actor)
Stewart Kyasimire (film director)

Military
The diary of World War I veteran Arthur Roberts has been noted as an important historical document, for its preservation of the historical record of one of the earliest known Black Scottish soldiers.

Sport

Association football
The British Guiana-born Andrew Watson is widely considered to be the world's first association footballer of Black heritage (his father was White and mother Black) to play at international level. He was capped three times for Scotland between 1881 and 1882. Watson also played for Queen's Park, the leading Scottish club at the time, and later became their secretary. He led the team to several Scottish Cup wins, thus becoming the first player of Black heritage to win a major competition.

With some brief exceptions, such as Jamaican born Gil Heron at Celtic, Walter Tull signing for Rangers, and John Walker at Hearts, Black players largely disappeared from Scottish football for the next 100 years until the arrival of Mark Walters at Rangers in 1988. Walters arrival at the club resulted in incidents of racial abuse.

The Scotland national team did not call up a second player of Black heritage until Nigel Quashie (Black Ghanaian father and White English mother), made his debut against Estonia in May 2004. He qualified to play for Scotland, due to having a grandfather from Scotland. Subsequently Coatbridge-born Chris Iwelumo (Black father from Nigeria), has also played for Scotland. Other notable players with black heritage who were born in Scotland, or have represented Scotland, include:

Che Adams
Ikechi Anya
Charles Boli
Jacob Brown
Ethan Erhahon
Islam Feruz
Kevin Harper
Chris Iwelumo
Vic Kasule
Leeroy Makovora
Leighton McIntosh
Brian McPhee
Dapo Mebude
Dire Mebude
Kieran Ngwenya
Iffy Onuora
Emmanuel Panther
Matt Phillips
Jai Quitongo
Callum Tapping
Ifeoma Dieke

Other Sports
 Joe Ansbro, Rugby
 Sean Crombie, Rugby
 Kieron Achara, Basketball
 Kwame Nkrumah-Acheampong, Winter Olympic Skier

Miscellaneous
Ellen More, servant to Margaret Tudor
Lesley Lokko (architect, academic, and novelist)
Jessie M Soga (suffragist and singer)

Cultural influence

Politics
In 2017, the SNP's Graham Campbell was elected as Scotland's first Rastafarian councillor, and Glasgow's first to have African Caribbean ancestry.

Social and political issues

Discrimination
The group have faced prejudice and racism in Scottish society. In a Strathclyde University survey, almost 45 percent of black Scottish reported experiencing discrimination between 2010 and 2015.

In fiction
 "Of Ane Blak-Moir", a poem describing an African woman at the court of James IV of Scotland.
Tavish Finnegan DeGroot, more well known as the Demoman from Team Fortress 2, is a self-described "black Scottish cyclops".
Jerome "Chef" McElroy, a character from South Park, hails from Scotland.
Jim "Jock" McClaren, a character in Porridge.
Elmo McElroy in The 51st State is a descendant of a relationship between a slave and their owner who is of the McElroy clan; thereby making him the heir to the ancestral estate.
In 2019, multiple media sources reported that African-American actor Denzel Washington would play the Scottish title character in Joel Coen's movie adaptation of William Shakespeare's play Macbeth.  The film was eventually released in 2021 as The Tragedy of Macbeth.

See also

 Demographics of Scotland
 Black British people
 Black African
 African diaspora
 Spain (surname)
 New Scots

References

 
Demographics of Scotland
Ethnic groups in Scotland
 
Black British history
Black British culture